Once Beaten, Twice Shy or  Eenmaal Geslagen, Nooit Meer Bewogen  is a 1995 Dutch film directed by Gerrard Verhage.

Cast
Ineke Veenhoven	... 	Mother
Jack Wouterse	... 	Charles
Ariane Schluter	... 	Gina
Kathenka Woudenberg	... 	Mary
Stefan de Walle	... 	Jozef
Floor Nuygen	... 	Angela
Bert Luppes	... 	Bart

External links 
 

Dutch drama films
1995 films
1990s Dutch-language films